Richard Robert Weber (born 25 February 1953) is a mathematician working in operational research. He is Emeritus Churchill Professor of Mathematics for Operational Research in the Statistical Laboratory, University of Cambridge.

Weber was educated at Walnut Hills High School, Solihull School and Downing College, Cambridge. He graduated in 1974,
and completed his PhD in 1980 under the supervision of Peter Nash. He has been on the faculty of the University of Cambridge since 1978, and a fellow of Queens' College since 1977  where he has been Vice President from 1996–2007 and again from 2018–2020. He was appointed Churchill Professor in 1994, and he became
Emeritus Churchill Professor on retirement in 2017. He was Director of the Statistical Laboratory from 1999 to 2009, and is a trustee of the Rollo Davidson Trust.

He works on the mathematics of large complex systems subject to uncertainty. He has made contributions to stochastic scheduling, Markov decision processes, queueing theory, the probabilistic analysis of algorithms, the theory of communications pricing and control, and rendezvous search.

Weber and his co-authors were awarded the 2007 INFORMS prize for their paper on the online bin packing algorithm.

Selected publications

References

1953 births
20th-century English mathematicians
Alumni of Downing College, Cambridge
21st-century English mathematicians
British operations researchers
Fellows of Queens' College, Cambridge
Living people
Cambridge mathematicians
People educated at Solihull School
Professors of the University of Cambridge